There are two EML programming languages:

 Extended ML, which is actually a specification language, and
 the Extensible ML programming language